Nikitin, or Nikitina (feminine; Никитина) is a common Russian surname that derives from the male given name Nikita and literally means Nikita's. It may refer to:

Artists, musicians, authors
Yevgeny Nikitin (bass-baritone), bass-baritone
Ivan Nikitich Nikitin (c. 1690–1742), Russian painter
Gury Nikitin (1620–1691), Russian icon painter
Ivan Savvich Nikitin (1824–1861), Russian poet
Basil Nikitin (1885–1960), Russian orientalist and diplomat
Sergey Nikitin (musician), contemporary Russian composer, singer and bard
Tatyana Nikitina, contemporary Russian singer and composer (wife of musician Sergey Nikitin)
Victor Ivanovich Nikitin, Soviet soloist with the Alexandrov Ensemble
Yuri Nikitin (author), contemporary Russian sci-fi writer
 (b. 1950), Russian sculptor

Athletes
Andriy Nikitin, Ukrainian football player and manager
Larisa Nikitina, contemporary Russian heptathlete
Vera Nikitina, contemporary Soviet hurdling athlete
Yuri Nikitin (gymnast), Ukrainian trampolinist
Boris Nikitin, Georgian swimmer
Nikita Nikitin, Russian ice hockey player
Sarah Nikitin, Brazilian Archer
Diana Nikitina, Latvian Figure Skater

Scientists, engineers and architects
Boris Nikitin (1906–1952), Soviet radiochemist
Nikolai Nikitin (1907–1973), Soviet structural design and construction engineer
Vasilii Vasilyevich Nikitin (1901–1955), Soviet aircraft engineer

Botanists
 There are at least five botanists with this surname, shown here followed by their standard author abbreviations :
Sergei Alekseevich Nikitin (1898–?)   S.A.Nikitin
Sergei Nikolaevic Nikitin (1850–1909)   Nikitin
Vasilii Vasilevich Nikitin (1906–1988)   V.V.Nikitin
Vladimir Alekseevich Nikitin (1906–1974)   V.A.Nikitin
Vladimir V. Nikitin (fl. 1996)   Vl.V.Nikitin

Nikitin and Some Emigrations World-wide 
The Nikitin surname spread from Russia to the rest of the world, including Europe, Canada, USA, and South America. 
It is also present in the 1913 New Israel migration from Voronezh to San Javier, Uruguay.
Mateo Nikitin (?–1472), a New Israel member in the Voronezh region back in 1800-1900 approximately, contemporary of the leader of the New Israel sect, Vasily Lubkov, and also contemporary of Ivan Savvich Nikitin (1824–1861), Russian poet (relatives not confirmed). He is one of the New Israel members who migrate with Vasily Lubkov from the Voronezh region to San Javier, Uruguay in 1913.
Basilio Nikitin (Spanish), born in San Javier, Uruguay in 1934 and deceased in 1998. 
Fernando Nikitin, born in San Javier, Uruguay. **** Seeking genealogical information about his ancestors back in Voronezh, including Mateo Nikitin. ****

Others
Afanasiy Nikitin (died 1472), a Russian explorer and merchant
Alexander Nikitin, contemporary Russian environment activist and a dissident Navy officer
, Russian artillery officer of the Napoleonic Wars 
Anfal Nikitin (fl. 1360), Novgorod boyar and ushkuynik
Basil Nikitin Soviet orientalist and diplomat
Vladilen Nikitin (1936–2021), Russian engineer and politician
Vladimir Nikitin, multiple people
Viktor Nikitin (1893–1933), Russian and Serbian pilot, killed in the first disaster of Yugoslav civil aviation

Russian-language surnames